Karl Baur (November 13, 1911 – October 12, 1963) was a German test pilot, flight instructor and engineer.  His friends referred to him truly as "A Pilot's Pilot".

Early life

Karl Baur was born November 13, 1911 in Laichingen, Württemberg, Germany. In 1927 he
attended a summer camp for young boys interested in aviation, and it was here that Baur
developed his desire to fly. He became involved in the world of glider flying during the
1930s, where with the F1 Fledermaus glider he completed the necessary distance, height,
and acrobatic flying requirements to earn an International Silver C Badge in 1934. (Only
19 of these were awarded at that year, and Baur was one of 15 Germans who received the
badge.) Baur also worked with powered aircraft and earned a private pilot license in
1931.

Instructor Pilot

In 1935 Baur accepted an opportunity to go to Japan and serve as instructor at a
Japanese glider school. He also did some acrobatic flying at various points around Japan, as well as a flight over the erupting volcano Mount Asama from a distance of 50 meters.

Upon his return to Germany in 1936, Baur completed his master's degree in Aeronautical Engineering (Dipl. Ing.)
and went to work for the German Aviation Research Institute testing aircraft designs and
instructing German pilots.  Baur was called to military duty and attempted to join the Luftwaffe in 1938, but
because of problems with his eyesight he could not pass the physical to be certified as a
military pilot. He stayed with the German Aviation Research Institute until 1939, when
he received an offer to become the Chief Test Pilot for the Messerschmitt Company.

Test Pilot and Engineer

At Messerschmitt he test piloted such famous aircraft as the Bf 109, the Me 262 jet fighter,
and the Me 163 rocket plane.  Here is a partial list of aircraft he flew:
 Bf 109
 Messerschmitt Me 209
 Messerschmitt Me 309
 Me 210 - Me 410
 Messerschmitt Me 261
 Me 264 Amerikabomber contract contender
 Me 321 Gigant - The Largest Glider in Combat During WW II
 Me 323
 Me 163 Komet
 Me 262 jet fighter including C-series rocket-boosted Heimatschützer I and II variants

On April 29, 1945 the allies captured the German city of
Augsburg, where Baur was working on Messerschmitt aircraft. Baur and his crew were
required by the American forces to repair the Me 262's that had been damaged and
instruct some American pilots in their operation. Along with other German experts in the
field of aeronautics and rocketry, Baur was sent to the United States in fall of 1945. He
spent several months in the United States demonstrating the Me 262 providing technical
help to American test pilots, and explaining about the aeronautic work he had done in
Germany. In December 1945 Baur was able to return to Germany and reunite with his
family.

Baur worked several odd jobs after the war including serving an interpreter to the
commander of an American Army Air Force Base in Germany, and as a sales
representative for a company that manufactured car batteries. Baur accepted a job as an
engineer at the Chance Vought Aircraft Corporation in Dallas, Texas in August 1954.
Baur worked for Chance Vought until his death on October 12, 1963. His widow, Isolde Baur lived in
the Dallas-Fort Worth area until her death on June 5, 2006.

References

Further reading

1911 births
1963 deaths
German aviators
German glider pilots
German test pilots
German aerospace engineers
German emigrants to the United States
People from Alb-Donau-Kreis
People from the Kingdom of Württemberg